Barton-upon-Humber or Barton is a town and civil parish in North Lincolnshire, England. The population at the 2011 census was 11,066. It is situated on the south bank of the Humber Estuary at the southern end of the Humber Bridge. Other nearby towns include Scunthorpe to the south-west and Grimsby to the south-east.

Geography
Barton is on the south bank of the Humber Estuary and is at the southern end of the Humber Bridge. The Viking Way starts near the bridge.

Transport connections
The Barton – Cleethorpes Branch Line (opened 1849) via Grimsby terminates at Barton-on-Humber railway station. The A15 passes to the west of the town cutting through Beacon Hill, and has a junction with the A1077 Ferriby Road to South Ferriby. The B1218 passes north–south through the town, and leads to Barton Waterside. Bus services provided by Stagecoach in Lincolnshire and East Yorkshire link the town with Cleethorpes, Grimsby, Scunthorpe and Hull.

History

Prehistoric
Cropmarks and the discovery of polished handaxes in the area surrounding Barton-upon-Humber suggest that the area was inhabited at least as far back as the Neolithic (circa 4000 to circa 2,500 BCE).

Roman
No Roman settlement has been found in Barton-upon-Humber, though individual discoveries dating to the Roman period have been made: in 1828 a Roman cremation and an inhumation were discovered, in 1967 part of a Roman road was excavated near Bereton school (now Baysgarth school), and other finds of coins, potteries, querns, and other Roman objects have been made. The Deepdale Hoard was discovered in the vicinity in 1979.

Anglo-Saxon

St Peter's Church has a Saxon tower. An Anglo-Saxon inhumation cemetery at Castledyke South, in use from the late 5th or early 6th century until the late 7th century, was investigated and partially excavated 1975–90: the skeletal remains of 227 individuals were identified, including one who had undergone (and survived) trepanning.  The church was reopened in May 2007 as a resource for medical research into the development of diseases, and ossuary, containing the bones and skeletons of some 2,750 people whose remains were removed between 1978 and 1984 from the 1,000-year-old burial site, after the Church of England made the church redundant in 1972. The significance of the human remains lies in their representing the pathology of an isolated community over the period ca. 950-ca. 1850. An excavation report on this, one of England's most extensively investigated parish churches (including a volume on the human remains) was published in 2007.
The Castledyke South area, has been suggested to be the site of one of the most defining battles in the history of the British Isles. Historical sources relating to the Battle of Brunanburh AD 937, tell of a huge fleet of warships entering the River Humber led by Olaf Guthfrithsson. Olaf and a coalition force, met King Æthelstan and his army in battle and were overwhelmed, after which, the defeated warriors and their leaders were said to have escaped in their ships.

Medieval
Barton is mentioned as a Medieval borough in documents dating from 1086, 1216–1272 and 1298. A ferry to Hull was first recorded in 1086, and remained in operation until 1851, but this was superseded by a ferry at New Holland which began in 1820. The oldest residential building in Barton is 51 Fleetgate: it dates back to 1325 with the majority of the front of the building dating to 1425. The Medieval manor in Barton was Tyrwhitt Hall which dates to at least the 15th century.

Churches
There are two Medieval churches extant in Barton-upon-Humber, St Peter's and St Mary's, located only about 170 yards apart. St Peter's is a large, mostly Anglo-Saxon church and predates St Mary's — which may have originated as a chapel on the original market place, enlarged and increasing in importance as the town's trade thrived in the 12th and 13th centuries.

18th century
William Hall's Barton Ropery opens in 1767.

19th century

The United Reformed Church (originally the Providence Chapel) was opened in 1806. It is the oldest surviving Independent chapel in Lincolnshire.
A Temperance Hall was opened in 1843 and latterly converted into the Assembly Rooms in 1906.
The Police Station and Magistrates Court was opened in 1847. 
The Wilderspin National School opened in 1844.
The first public train arrived in Barton-upon-Humber on 1 March 1849; this fact is commemorated by a blue plaque at the modern railway station.
The Trinity Methodist Church was built in 1860–1861.
The Oddfellow's Hall was constructed in 1864. It latterly served as Barton's first cinema, a roller skating rink, a dance hall during the Second World War, and as offices and private accommodations.
What is now the Salvation Army Citadel was first opened as a Primitive Methodist Chapel in 1867.
In 1880 Fred Hopper started a bicycle repair business in a former blacksmith's shop in the town. He soon began manufacturing bicycles, and after buying the Elswick Cycle Company of Newcastle, Northumberland in 1910, developed the renamed Elswick Hopper into a major manufacturer.

20th century
The war memorial records the deaths of 165 men from Barton who died fighting in the First World War. The memorial was unveiled on 3 April 1921 and is a Grade II listed structure.
A further 48 men and women who died fighting in the Second World War are also recorded on the memorial.
In 1922 the Oxford Picture Theatre opened on Newport. It was subsequently renamed as the 'Oxford Cinema', and closed in 1966. The building has since been used as a bingo hall and sports centre.
The Star Theatre was opened on Fleetgate around 1934. By 1953 it had been renamed the Star cinema. It closed in June 1957 and was subsequently demolished.

Education
Baysgarth School, on Barrow Road, is a comprehensive school for ages 11–18. There are also three primary schools: St Peter's Church of England, on Marsh Lane; the Castledyke Primary School (formerly Barton County School), on the B1218; and Bowmandale Primary School, in the south of the town.

Barton Grammar School, which opened in 1931, used to be on Caistor Road. Henry Treece, the poet and author, was a teacher at the grammar school.

Industry
The clay pits on the Humber foreshore were the focus of a tile and cement industry from 1850 to 1959. The industrial sites were abandoned in the early 20th century once supplies of clay began to run out. The clay workings filled with water and became colonised by species of reeds. The reserve was acquired by Lincolnshire Wildlife Trust in 1983, who opened it as Far Ings National Nature Reserve in the same year.

For 20 years, Barton-upon-Humber was home to a  site for Kimberly-Clark. The site closed in March 2013 and more than 200 jobs were lost. Wren Kitchens bought the site and moved to a new head office, 'The Nest', on the site, initially employing 429 people. Wren extended the site in 2016, creating an additional 600 jobs. In 2019 Wren announced successful plans to build a £120million extension to the site. The new site was expected to employ an additional 535 people.

Culture

Events
An annual 'Bike night', a social event in the town celebrating motorcycles, has been held since 1997. An annual arts festival has been held in Barton-upon-Humber since 1998.

Museums
Since 1981, there has been a local history museum based in Baysgarth House, within Baysgarth Park. In 2009, the Wilderspin National School museum opened following a £1.9 million funding investment. The school focuses on the life and works of Samuel Wilderspin. In September 2020 an archive and exhibition centre dedicated to Ted Lewis was opened on Ferriby Road.

Public Houses
Barton-upon-Humber has at least seven extant public houses, including The Volunteer Arms, The George Hotel, and The Wheatsheaf. At least thirteen former public houses have been recorded from Barton, including the Steam Packet (on Fleetgate) which was demolished in 1848 in advance of the new railway here, and the Whitecross Tavern which closed in 1926. Former pubs which have recently closed and since been redeveloped include The Blue Bell, which was redeveloped in 2016 into a housing complex named Blue Bell Court, and the Carnival Inn, which was demolished in 2013.

Notable people

See also
 Barton, Maryland, United States - Settled by the Barton-upon-Humber minister William Shaw.
 Humber Ferry

References

Further information

External links

 Inbarton — Barton upon Humber
 Barton a town with a past and a future.
 The Historic Timeline of Barton upon Humber
 

 
Towns in Lincolnshire
Civil parishes in Lincolnshire
Borough of North Lincolnshire